Brewery Creek is a stream in the U.S. state of California. The stream runs  before it empties into the Sacramento River.

Brewery Creek was so named for the breweries near its course.

References

Rivers of California
Rivers of Tehama County, California